The Bucharest Observatory is an astronomical observatory located at no. 21 Lascăr Catargiu Boulevard, Bucharest, Romania.

The observatory was built between 1908 and 1910, for Admiral Vasile Urseanu. It was equipped with a 150 mm diameter Zeiss telescope with a focal length of 2.7 meters; the telescope was the third largest in Romania at the time.  Ion D. Berindey was the architect. It is Bucharest’s only observatory open to the public.

The Urseanu House is listed as a historic monument by Romania's Ministry of Culture and Religious Affairs.

External links

Notes

Museums in Bucharest
Science museums in Romania
Historic monuments in Bucharest
Astronomical observatories in Romania
1910 establishments in Romania
Houses completed in 1910